is a Japanese politician and the current mayor of Kyoto, the capital city of Kyoto Prefecture.

Overview 
Born in Nakagyo Ward, Kyoto City, Kyoto Prefecture, he graduated from Kyoto Municipal Horikawa High School with a timed general course, then joined the Kyoto City Board of Education, and then went on to Ritsumeikan University Faculty of Law No. 2 to obtain a degree. He resigned as Kyoto City Minister of Education in 2007, and was re-elected to the 2008 Kyoto mayoral election by the Liberal Democratic Party, the Komeito Party, and the Democratic Party of Kyoto Prefectural Division, as well as the Social Democratic Party of Kyoto.

Person 

Kadokawa likes the kimono and always attends city council meetings and other events wearing one. It is customary for the mayor of Kyoto to wear traditional Japanese clothes.
In June 2019, he sent Kim Kardashian of the United States a letter of protest attempt to trademark the name "KIMONO" for her new underwear line.  In the letter he said "It is a common asset of all people who love the culture of the Japanese and the Japanese and the world," and I believe that it should not be monopolized privately."

Controversy 
On the evening of July 18, 2019, when Kadkawa attended a party for the 25th House of Councillors who usually elect a candidate for the Kyoto Prefecture constituency, he mentioned the Kyoto Animation arson case, saying that "3 minutes and 10 minutes are important when fighting fires, and the election can be reversed in the last two days", which was criticized as inappropriate remarks Kadokawa himself apologized for speaking on the 19th.

References

External links 

1950 births
Living people
Mayors of Kyoto
People from Kyoto
Politicians from Kyoto Prefecture
Ritsumeikan University alumni